The 1902 WAFA season was the 18th season of senior Australian rules football in Perth, Western Australia.

Ladder

References

West Australian Football League seasons
WAFL